The red and blue damsel (Xanthagrion erythroneurum) is a damselfly in the family Coenagrionidae. 
It is the only member of the monotypic genus Xanthagrion.

Description
The face and thorax are bright red. The abdomen is pale in colour and 2.2-2.4 cm long.  The female and male are similar in colour.

Distribution and habitat
The red and blue damsel is widespread across all Australian states,
as well as Fiji, New Caledonia, and other islands in the Pacific.
It is found in north and eastern Tasmania. It is typically found near dams, marshes and slow watercourses.

Gallery

References

Coenagrionidae
Insects of New Caledonia
Insects of Australia
Insects described in 1876
Damselflies